"Nature Anthem" is a song by American indie rock band Grandaddy, released as a single in 2004 in conjunction with the album Below the Radio.

Music video 

Its music video features people out in nature dressed up in animal costumes.

Legacy 

The title song was played in a Honda Civic Hybrid television commercial in 2005, and Coca-Cola's summer advertising campaign in 2006.

Track listing

References

External links 

 
 

2004 singles
Grandaddy songs
2004 songs